() is an Estonian television mystery music game show series based on the South Korean programme of the same name. Since its premiere on 27 February 2022, it has aired two seasons on Kanal 2.

Gameplay

Format
Presented with a group of seven "mystery singers" identified only by their occupation, a guest artist and a group of two contestants must attempt to eliminate bad singers from the group without ever hearing them sing, assisted by clues and a celebrity panel over the course of four rounds. At the end of the game, the last remaining mystery singer is revealed as either good or bad by means of a duet between them and one of the guest artists.

Rewards
If the singer is good, the contestants win ; if the singer is bad, the same amount is given to the bad singer instead.

Rounds
Each episode presents the guest artist and contestants with seven people whose identities and singing voices are kept concealed until they are eliminated to perform on the "stage of truth" or remain in the end to perform the final duet.

Notes:

Production

Background and development
Following the announcement for the development of the series through CJ ENM and Fremantle's joint agreement in November 2020, TV3 has initially made an interest to adapt I Can See Your Voice following the successful broadcasts of Maskis laulja. Then on January 2022, Duo Media Networks formally acquired the rights to produce a local adaptation of that said programme. It is produced by Ruut; the staff team is managed by executive producer Triin Luhats, producer Kaupo Karelson, and director Anna Stepanova.

Filming
Tapings for the programme took place at various locations such as Stuudio 3 in Lasnamäe, Tallinn (for the first season) and ETV Stuudio 4 in Kesklinn (for the second season).

Broadcast

History
Ma näen su häält debuted on 27 February 2022, two weeks before TV3's rival show Maskis laulja premiered the third season on 13 March 2022. After the first season broadcasts, the series has been already renewed for the second season that premiered on 18 September 2022.

Special episode and companion events
After the first-season finale, a postseason episode (dubbed as) followed airing on 22 May 2022, in which includes behind the scenes and unaired moments, as well as exclusive interviews from the show's cast and production staff.

For the second season, two companion events were added — an in-game event  is conducted during the game; and then documentary lead-out aftershow  is aired following the main programme.

Cast
The series employs a team of "celebrity panelists" who decipher mystery singers' evidences throughout the game. Alongside with full-timers and additional ones, guest panelists also appear since the first season. Throughout its broadcast, the programme has assigned 6 different panelists. Beside with original cast, later additions also include  (from second season).

Series overview

Episodes

Season 1 (2022)

Season 2 (2022)

Specials

Accolades

Notes

References

Ma näen su häält
2020s Estonian television series
2022 Estonian television series debuts
Estonian television series based on South Korean television series
Kanal 2 original programming